The 2013–14 Central Connecticut Blue Devils men's basketball team represented Central Connecticut State University during the 2013–14 NCAA Division I men's basketball season. The Blue Devils, led by 18th year head coach Howie Dickenman, played their home games at the William H. Detrick Gymnasium and were members of the Northeast Conference. They finished the season 11–19, 7–9 in NEC play to finish in a tie for sixth place and lost in the quarterfinals of the Northeast Conference tournament to Wagner.

Roster

Schedule

|-
!colspan=9 style="background:#1F24B4; color:#C0C0C0;"| Regular season

|-
!colspan=9 style="background:#1F24B4; color:#C0C0C0;"| 2014 Northeast Conference tournament

References

Central Connecticut Blue Devils men's basketball seasons
Central Connecticut
Central Connecticut Blue Devils
Central Connecticut Blue Devils